Augusto Rafael Sandino Martin (born October 12, 1991) or known professionally as Sandino Martin is a Filipino actor.

Personal life
Martin was raised a Mormon.

Filmography

Television

Film

Theater

Awards and nominations

Notes

References

External links
 

Living people
Star Magic
1991 births